Ngalda River is a river in Nigeria that has its source in the commercial town of Ngalda community, in Fika local government area of Yobe State. The Ngda is also connected with Ngaji River about 40 kilometres to the north. The 2022 flooding from the river has made over 1000 people homeless.

References

Rivers of Nigeria